This is a list of sister cities in the United States state of Pennsylvania. Sister cities, known in Europe as twin towns, are cities which partner with each other to promote human contact and cultural links, although this partnering is not limited to cities and often includes counties, regions, states and other sub-national entities.

Many Pennsylvania jurisdictions work with foreign cities through Sister Cities International, an organization whose goal is to "promote peace through mutual respect, understanding, and cooperation."

A
Allentown
 Tiberias, Israel

Altoona
 Sankt Pölten, Austria

Ambler
 Maida, Italy

B
Bethlehem

 Corfu, Greece
 Foiano di Val Fortore, Italy
 Murska Sobota, Slovenia
 Schwäbisch Gmünd, Germany
 Tondabayashi, Japan

Boyertown
 Bohodukhiv, Ukraine

C
Caln Township
 Calne, England, United Kingdom

Chambersburg
 Gotemba, Japan

Cheltenham Township
 Cheltenham, England, United Kingdom

Clarks Summit
 Ystradgynlais, Wales, United Kingdom

Cranberry Township
 Haiyang, China

D
Dalton
 Dalton-in-Furness, England, United Kingdom

Drumore Township
 Dromore, Northern Ireland, United Kingdom

E
East Norriton Township
 Treptow-Köpenick (Berlin), Germany

Elizabethtown
 Letterkenny, Ireland

Ephrata
 Eberbach, Germany

Erie

 Dungarvan, Ireland
 Lublin, Poland
 Mérida, Mexico
 Zibo, China

F
Fleetwood
 Fleetwood, England, United Kingdom

G
Gettysburg

 Gettysburg, South Dakota, United States
 León, Nicaragua
 Morelia, Mexico
 Sainte-Mère-Église, France
 Sekigahara, Japan

Greensburg
 Cercemaggiore, Italy

H
Harrisburg
 Ma'alot-Tarshiha, Israel

Hazleton
 Bussento - Lambro e Mingardo, Italy

K
Kutztown
 Altrip, Germany

L
Lancaster

 Beit Shemesh, Israel
 Sano, Japan

Limerick Township
 Limerick, Ireland

Lititz
 Kunvald, Czech Republic

M
Monongahela
 Ono San Pietro, Italy

N
New Holland
 Longvic, France

Norristown
 Montella, Italy

Northampton
 Stegersbach, Austria

P
Philadelphia

 Abruzzo, Italy
 Aix-en-Provence, France
 Douala, Cameroon
 Florence, Italy
 Frankfurt am Main, Germany
 Incheon, South Korea

 Nizhny Novgorod, Russia
 Tel Aviv, Israel
 Tianjin, China
 Toruń, Poland

Pittsburgh

 Bilbao, Spain
 Da Nang, Vietnam
 Fernando de la Mora, Paraguay
 Gaziantep, Turkey
 Glasgow, Scotland, United Kingdom
 Karmiel, Israel
 Matanzas, Cuba
 Misgav, Israel
 Naucalpan, Mexico
 Ostrava, Czech Republic
 Prešov, Slovakia

 Saitama, Japan
 San Isidro, Nicaragua
 Sheffield, England, United Kingdom
 Skopje, North Macedonia
 Sofia, Bulgaria
 Wuhan, China
 Zagreb, Croatia

R
Reading
 Reutlingen, Germany

Roseto
 Roseto Valfortore, Italy

S
Saxonburg
 Mühlhausen, Germany

Scranton

 Ballina, Ireland
 Guardia Lombardi, Italy

W
Williamsport
Ma'ale Adumim, West Bank

Y
York

 Arles, France
 Leinfelden-Echterdingen, Germany

References

Pennsylvania
Pennsylvania geography-related lists
Populated places in Pennsylvania
Cities in Pennsylvania